Egremont is an unincorporated community in Sharkey County, Mississippi, United States.  A variant name for the community is "Baconia".

Gallery

History
During the American Civil War of 1861–1865, a military campaign launched by Union forces was slowed by obstructions placed along Deer Creek at the Egremont Plantation.

In 1880, the Egremont Plantation became the property of Hezekiah William Foote.  It was inherited by his son Huger Lee Foote, who was elected Sheriff of Sharkey County in 1890, and went on to serve in the Mississippi Legislature.

In 1984, sculptor Wesley Bobo erected a steel dinosaur along Route 61 in Egremont.

A local juke joint called "Willie Mama's" was located in Egremont, but closed in 2007. It re-opened under the name "The Waterin Hole".

References

External links
 Photo of former "Willie Mama's" juke joint in Egremont

Unincorporated communities in Sharkey County, Mississippi
Unincorporated communities in Mississippi